Hukani-ye Sofla (also Romanized as Hūkanī-ye Soflá; also known as Hūkānī, Hūkanī-ye Sabzeh, and Hūkānī-ye Sabzeh Soflá) is a village in Howmeh-ye Kerend Rural District, in the Central District of Dalahu County, Kermanshah Province, Iran. At the 2006 census, its population was 36, in 10 families.

References 

Populated places in Dalahu County